The Kazakhstan national beach soccer team represents Kazakhstan in international beach soccer competitions and is controlled by the Football Federation of Kazakhstan, the governing body for football in Kazakhstan.

Competitive record

FIFA Beach Soccer World Cup Qualification (UEFA)

Current squad
Correct as of July 2010

Achievements
 FIFA Beach Soccer World Cup qualification (UEFA) Best: Group stage
 2011

External links
 Squad
 Profile on bsrussia.com

European national beach soccer teams
Beach Soccer